"The Arms of Sorrow" is a song by American metalcore band Killswitch Engage. The song is the third song and second single from their 2006 release, As Daylight Dies. The video for this song premiered on the band's MySpace profile on April 26, 2007. This song is also track three on the 2007 Warped Tour Compilation. The song primarily showcases vocalist Howard Jones' clean vocals as it only features his trademark screams in the backing vocals, but the very end shows clear usage of the screams.

The song charted at No. 30 on the US Mainstream Rock chart.

Music video 
The video for "The Arms of Sorrow" shows a man (Antal Kalik) falling through the air in slow motion. As he falls, he passes an apartment building. He falls past a woman doing laundry, an elderly man cutting a board with a power saw, a younger girl blowing bubbles, a woman slapping her boyfriend, two men painting, a muscular man skipping rope, a fireman on a ladder, the band, and a woman throwing a bucket of water out the window, before eventually falling into a swimming pool. Finally, the man climbs out of the pool by using the pool ladder. Scenes of the band playing in a room are shown between scenes of the man falling.

References

Killswitch Engage songs
Roadrunner Records singles
Heavy metal ballads
2006 songs
Songs written by Howard Jones (American musician)